An olive grove is a small group of Olea europaea trees.

Olive grove may also refer to:

 Olive Grove, Sheffield Wednesday F.C.'s first permanent football ground
 Olive Grove, a suburb of Somerset West, South Africa 
 Olive Grove Elementary School, a school in California serving grades K-5
 "An Olive Grove Facing the Sea", a song by Snow Patrol